The Port of Constanța is located in Constanța, Romania, on the western coast of the Black Sea,  from the Bosphorus Strait and  from the Sulina Branch, through which the Danube river flows into the sea. The two breakwaters located northwards and southwards shelter the port, creating the safest conditions for port activities. The Port of Constanța is the largest on the Black Sea and the 17th largest in Europe.

The favourable geographical position and the importance of the Port of Constanța is emphasized by the connection with two Pan-European transport corridors: IV (high speed railway&highway) and the Pan-European Corridor VII (Danube). The two satellite ports, Midia and Mangalia, located not far from Constanța Port, are part of the Romanian maritime port system under the coordination of the Maritime Ports Administration SA.

History
The history of the port is closely related to the history of Constanța. Although Constanța was founded in the 2nd century AD the old Greek colony of Tomis was founded in the 6th century BC. The port-city was organised as an emporium to ease the trade between the Greeks and the local peoples. The Greek influence is maintained until the 1st century BC, when the territory between the Danube and the Black Sea was occupied by the Romans. The first years of Roman governorate were recorded by Ovid, who was exiled to Tomis for unknown reasons. In the next hundred years the port had a substantial development and the city changes its name to Constanța in honour of the Roman Emperor Constantine I.

In the Byzantine period the evolution of the port is halted due to the frequent invasions by the migratory people, the trade was fading and the traders were looking for other more secure markets like Venice or Genoa but many constructions in the port maintain the name genovese in the memory of the merchants from the Italian city. After a brief period when the port was under Romanian rule, the Dobruja region was occupied by the Ottoman Empire. In 1857, the Turkish authorities leased the port and the Cernavodă–Constanța Railway to the British company Danube and Black Sea Railway and Kustendge Harbour Company Ltd.

The construction of the port began on October 16, 1896, when King Carol I set the first stepping stone for the construction and modernization of the port. The construction works were started with the help of Romanian engineer I. B. Cantacuzino, and the later developments were attributed to Gheorghe Duca and Anghel Saligny. The port was finished and first opened in 1909 and had adequate facilities for that time, with 6 storage basins, a number of oil reservoirs, and grain silos. With these facilities, the port operated 1.4 million tons of cargo in 1911. Between the two World Wars, the port was equipped with a corn drier and a floating dock; a new building for the port administration was built and a stock exchange was established.

Starting with 1967, the port was expanded to the south. The construction of the Danube–Black Sea Canal, which opened in 1984, had a major role in the development of the port. The height of cargo traffic was achieved in 1988, when the port handled  of cargo. After the Romanian Revolution of 1989, the port faded in importance for the Romanian economy, traffic was dwindling and in 2000 the port registered its lowest traffic since World War II of 30 million tonnes of cargo. The traffic started growing again after 2003 and reached a record  in 2008, the second largest cargo traffic in the history of the port. The most recent terminals entered in service in 2004 (container terminal), 2005 (passenger terminal) and 2006 (barge terminal).

Operations

Constanța Port is both a maritime and a river port. Daily, more than 200 river vessels are in the port for cargo loading or unloading or waiting to be operated. The connection of the port with the Danube river is made through the Danube–Black Sea Canal, which represents one of the main strengths of Constanța Port. Important cargo quantities are carried by river, between Constanta and Central and Eastern European countries: Bulgaria, Serbia, Hungary, Austria, Slovakia and Germany. River traffic is very important for the Constanța Port, having a share of 23.3% of the total traffic in 2005, when 8,800 river vessels called to the port.

Connections
The rail network in the Port of Constanța is connected to the Romanian and European rail network, with the Port of Constanța being a starting and terminus point for Corridor IV, a Pan-European corridor. Round-the-clock train services carry high volumes of cargo to the most important economic areas of Romania and Eastern Europe, the Port of Constanța being also an important transport node of the TRACECA Corridor, providing the connection between Europe, Caucasus and Central Asia.

The ten gates of the Port of Constanța are connected with the Romanian and European road network via DN39 and DN39A national roads and the A4 motorway. The connection with Corridor IV has a strategic importance, linking the Port of Constanța with the landlocked countries from Central and Eastern Europe. Constantza port is also located close to Corridor IX, passing through Bucharest.

The oil terminal has seven operational jetties. Jetties allow berthage for vessels up to  capacity. Connection between storage farms and jetties is done by a  underground and overground pipelines network. The Port of Constanța is connected to the national pipeline system and to the main Romanian refineries. The port is also a starting and terminus point for the Pan-European Pipeline designed to the transportation of Russian and Caspian oil to Central Europe.

Satellite ports

Both perform a vital function in the overall plan to increase the efficiency of the main port's facilities - and both are facing continuous upgradings in order to meet the growing demands of cargo owners. In 2004 the traffic achieved by the two satellite ports was 3% from the general traffic, 97% being achieved by the Port of Constanța.

Statistics

The port is the main container hub in the Black Sea and all direct lines between Asia and Black Sea call in Constanța. This is due to the efficiency of the Constanţa South Container Terminal (CSCT), operated by DP World, and to the natural position of the port with deep water (up to ) and a direct link to the Danube. The main port operators are A. P. Moller-Maersk Group, APM Terminals, Dubai Ports World, SOCEP, Oil Terminal S.A. and Comvex.

* figures in tonnes

Terminals

The terminal has 10 berths with storage facilities for phosphorus , urea  and chemical products .
For refrigerated products, the terminal has one berth and an annual storage capacity of  tonnes. The terminal has one berth, the organic oils are stored in seven storage tanks of  each, and the molasses is directly discharged in ships, rail cars or tankers.

For cement and construction materials, there are two terminals with seven berths and a storage capacity of 40,000 tonnes and an annual traffic capacity of 4 million tonnes. There is also a private cement terminal operated by a Spanish company Ceminter International with an annual traffic capacity of 1 million tonnes.

There are two roll on roll off (roro) terminals with two berths, one in Constanța North with storage for 4,800 vehicles and one in Constanța South with storage for 1,800 vehicles. The ferry-boat terminal has one berth used for loading and unloading railway cars, locomotives and trucks.

Hutchison Whampoa was interested in investing around US$80 million in a new container terminal of 650–700,000 twenty-foot equivalent unit (TEUs) located in Constanța South on a  plot of land. The terminal was finished in 2010.

The passenger terminal situated in Constanța North has an annual traffic capacity of 100,000 people. In 2014, the port was visited by 92 passenger ships which had on board around 69,910 tourists.

The barge terminal has one berth and it is located in Constanța South on the eastern shore of the Danube–Black Sea Canal. The tugboat terminal has one berth and it is located in Constanța South on the western shore of the Danube–Black Sea Canal.

In 2010 the largest liquefied petroleum gas (LPG) terminal in Romania was opened in the Port of Midia by Octagon Gas, after an initial investment of €12 million.

References

External links
Official site

Constanta
Transport in Constanța
Buildings and structures in Constanța
Ports and harbours of the Black Sea
Constanta